is a former Japanese football player.

Playing career
Yamauchi was born in Hyogo Prefecture on September 4, 1978. After graduating from Kwansei Gakuin University, he joined J1 League club Cerezo Osaka in 2001. He played many matches as side back from first season. However the club finished at bottom place and was relegated to J2 League. In 2002 season, his opportunity to play decreased and he retired end of 2002 season.

Club statistics

References

External links

1978 births
Living people
Kwansei Gakuin University alumni
Association football people from Hyōgo Prefecture
Japanese footballers
J1 League players
J2 League players
Cerezo Osaka players
Association football defenders